A culă (plural: cule; from Turkish kule "tower, turret") is a semi-fortified building found in the Oltenia region of Romania with a number of examples located in the historical province of Muntenia. They were originally built as homes for the ruling Boyar class to defend against violent raids by rebels from the south of the Danube during the eighteenth century and also against riots by local population against the boyars (e.g. Osman Pazvantoğlu). Similar constructions exist throughout the Balkans, see Tower houses in the Balkans.

List of cule
Oltenia:
Cula Barbu Poenaru (1750), from Almăj, Dolj
Cula Izvoranu, from Brabova, Dolj
Cula Crăsnaru (1808), from Groşerea, Aninoasa, Gorj
Cula Cornoiu from  Curtişoara, Gorj
Cula Cartianu from Cartiu, Gorj
Cula Grecescu (1818), from Şiacu, Slivileşti, Gorj
Cula Cuţui (1815) from Broşteni, Mehedinţi
Cula Tudor Vladimirescu (1800) from  Cerneţi, Mehedinţi
Cula Nistor (1812), from  Cerneţi, Mehedinţi
Cula Galiţa (1790), from Câmpu Mare, Dobroteasa, Olt
Cula Bujoreanu from Bujoreni, Vâlcea
Cula Greceanu from  Măldărești, Vâlcea (the oldest in Romania, approximately 1517)
Cula Zătreanu from  Zătreni (1754), Vâlcea

Muntenia:

Cula Racoviţa, from Mioveni, Argeş
Cula Drugănescu from Retevoieşti, Pietroșani, Argeș
Cula lui Costea, from Frăsinet, Teleorman

References

External links 
 https://web.archive.org/web/20160124230850/http://www.kule.ro/en/ Romanian kulas

Oltenia
Architecture in Romania